The 2020 Joe McDonagh Cup Final was played at Croke Park in Dublin on 13 December 2020. It was contested by Antrim and Kerry.

The game took place before the 2020 All-Ireland Senior Hurling Championship Final. Antrim won the competition for the first time and were thus promoted to the 2021 All-Ireland Senior Hurling Championship (the sport's top flight).

The match was televised live on RTÉ2 as part of The Sunday Game, presented by Joanne Cantwell from Croke Park, with commentary from Ger Canning.

Darren Gleeson was manager. Conor McCann was captain.

Belfast City Hall lit up in yellow on 24 January 2021 in commemoration of Antrim's win.

Match details

Notes

References

Joe McDonagh Cup Final
Joe McDonagh Cup
Joe McDonagh Cup Finals
Antrim county hurling team matches
Kerry county hurling team matches